Pocket Symphonies is an American, Austin indie rock band, formed in 2000. Their debut album Leaving Is Believing was well received by the Austin Chronicle. Also, the recording of the album attracted Fastball vocalist Tony Scalzo and Young Heart Attack guitarist Chris "Frenchie" Smith, both who took part in the recording. The Pocket Symphonies are currently recording their next album Echo Park which was released in 2006.

The members of the band are Paul Etheredge on vocals and keyboards, Sean Beckius on bass, Brian Reed on drums, and Jason Buntz on guitar.

Discography

Albums
Leaving Is Believing (2002)
Echo Park 2006)

External links
  Pocket Symphonies Official web site
 Pocket Symphonies' Record Label
 Pocket Symphonies review in the Austin Chronicle

Indie rock musical groups from Texas
Musical groups from Austin, Texas
Musical groups established in 2000
2000 establishments in Texas